Coon Creek is a stream in Faribault County, Minnesota and Kossuth County, Iowa. It is a tributary of the Blue Earth River.

Coon Creek was named for the raccoons once hunted in the area for their fur.

See also
List of rivers of Iowa
List of rivers of Minnesota

References

Rivers of Faribault County, Minnesota
Rivers of Kossuth County, Iowa
Rivers of Iowa
Rivers of Minnesota